Elachista contisella is a moth of the family Elachistidae that is found in France.

References

contisella
Moths described in 1922
Endemic insects of Metropolitan France
Moths of Europe